Gustavo Adolfo Becker Lasso (born 17 June 1966 in Barcelona) is a retired Spanish athlete who specialised in the high jump. He represented his country at three indoor and two outdoor World Championships.

His personal bests in the event are 2.30 metres outdoors (Eberstadt 1992) and 2.28 metres indoors (Oviedo 1991).

Competition record

References

1966 births
Living people
Spanish male high jumpers
Athletes from Barcelona
World Athletics Championships athletes for Spain
Athletes (track and field) at the 1992 Summer Olympics
Olympic athletes of Spain
Mediterranean Games silver medalists for Spain
Mediterranean Games medalists in athletics
Athletes (track and field) at the 1991 Mediterranean Games
Athletes (track and field) at the 1993 Mediterranean Games